The Cannibal Man (Spanish La Semana del asesino, literally "Week of the Killer") is a 1972 horror film, directed by Eloy de la Iglesia and written by de la Iglesia and Antonio Fos. Despite the international title, the film contains no scenes of cannibalism.  The film is also known as The Apartment On The 13th Floor.

The film was featured on the British Director of Public Prosecutions' list of "Video Nasties".

Plot 

After accidentally killing a taxicab driver, Marcos (Vicente Parra), a young man who works as a butcher, wants to cover up his crime. Marcos's girlfriend Paula (Emma Cohen), the only witness, wishes to go to the police, so he strangles her. Marcos finds himself killing others, including members of his family, as they become suspicious of his actions, butchering his victims' remains at his workplace in order to dispose of the bodies.

Background 

TV Guide opined that "this bloody, politically inflected drama is not at all what the exploitative English-language title suggests. [...] Though the US title suggests a zombie gut-cruncher and the marketing campaign was designed to make Eloy de la Iglesia's film look like a Last House on the Left (1972) knock-off, The Cannibal Man is both a study of an apparently ordinary person spiraling into madness and a slyly satirical evocation of life in Spain under the oppressive Franco regime."

Cast 
 Vicente Parra as Marcos
 Emma Cohen as Paula
 Eusebio Poncela as Néstor
 Vicky Lagos as Rosa
 Lola Herrera as Carmen
 Charly Bravo as Esteban
 Fernando Sánchez Polack as Señor Ambrosio 
 Goyo Lebrero as Taxista
 Ismael Merlo as Jefe de personal
 Rafael Hernández as Agustín
  as Tendero 
 Valentín Tornos as Obrero 
 Antonio Orengo as Camarero
 Antonio Corencia as Obrero burlón
 Antonio del Real as Obrero burlón

Critical reception 

PopMatters called the film "a refreshing forgotten gem". DVD Verdict called it "an extremely well-made Euro thriller with welcome social commentary and subtext. Suspenseful, disturbing and graphically violent, the film succeeds in its depictions of both physical and psychological horror."

References

External links 

 

1972 films
Films directed by Eloy de la Iglesia
1972 horror films
Spanish horror thriller films
Fratricide in fiction
Films about cannibalism
Video nasties
1970s slasher films
Films shot in Madrid
Spanish slasher films